is a 1944 Japanese drama and propaganda film written and directed by Akira Kurosawa. The semidocumentary film follows a group of female volunteer workers at an optics factory during the Second World War, during which the film was produced.

Plot
Set during World War II, the film depicts the struggle of female volunteer workers to meet production targets at a precision optics factory in Hiratsuka. They drive themselves, individually and collectively, to exceed the targets set for them by the factory directors. The factory directors push the girls to be their best for their country. The girls live in a dormitory, and every day they march and sing songs about Japan's greatness while on the way to work. They live away from their parents but are happy to do so to serve their country. Every morning before work, they pledge that they will be loyal to Japan and will work to destroy the U.S. and Britain. There are encouraging signs posted everywhere about working hard for one's country in the factory. One of the girls gets sick and has to stay home, making her incredibly upset about missing work and cries because of the tremendous guilt she feels. She begs not to be sent home because she wants to keep working. Later on, a girl falls off the roof and gets badly injured. Yet she says she is delighted that she did not harm her hands and will come to work on crutches. Their productivity decreases, the girls know their reputation is at stake, and they must work harder. One of the girls says that "one can't improve productivity without improving one's character." Watanabe's mother gets sick, her dad writes that under no circumstance should she come home, and her mother wants her to keep working, saying that her job is too important to leave. Near the end of the film, one of the girls gets a high temperature and tries to ignore it because she does not want to get sent home or stop working. Later on, Watanabe accidentally misplaces a lens and spends the entire night looking for it, she is worried her mistake will cost a soldier their life. The film ends with Watanabe's mom dying and her father telling her to stay at work. The factory directors ask her to go home. She refuses to go and cries while continuing her work.

Cast
Takashi Shimura as Chief Goro Ishida
Soji Kiyokawa as Soichi Yoshikawa
Ichiro Sugai as Ken Sanada
Takako Irie as Noriko Mizushima
Sayuri Tanima as Yuriko Tanimura
Sachiko Ozaki as Sachiko Yamazaki
Asako Suzuki as Asako Suzumura
Haruko Toyama as Masako Koyama
Yoko Yaguchi as Tsuru Watanabe

Production
According to Stephen Prince, Akira Kurosawa had been chosen by the navy to direct an action film about Zero fighter planes. But by 1943, he thought it unlikely that the navy would spare planes for a film as it was becoming clear that Japan would lose the war. So Kurosawa made this "patriotic morale booster" instead. The director shot The Most Beautiful with a "semidocumentary approach." It was filmed on-location at the Nippon Kogaku factory in Hiratsuka, where he had the actresses live, work, and form a fife and drum corps.

Actress Yoko Yaguchi clashed over the alleged ways Kurosawa treated the actors. However, the pair found a connection, despite these clashes, and married in 1945. Although Prince writes that Kurosawa later chastised himself for doing so little to resist Japan's descent into militarism, the director also remarked that, of all his films, The Most Beautiful was dearest to him.

Reissues
The Criterion Collection has released The Most Beautiful on DVD in North America as part of two 2009 Kurosawa-centered box sets; The First Films of Akira Kurosawa, the 23rd entry in their Eclipse series, and AK 100: 25 Films by Akira Kurosawa.

Critical reception
Paul Anderer of Columbia University has commented on the subtext of the film having been released during the war years for Japan. Anderer said, "It is as if Kurosawa himself were in this lineup (of directors under state scrutiny), frozen inside wartime, when any significant movement or resistance to the authority would be stillborn. Surrounded by a censorship apparatus far more resourceful and intimidating, he would later claim, than anything the American Occupation threw his way, he had few thematic or tonal options: historical tributes to Japanese spiritual and martial values (like Sanshiro Sugata and its weaker sequel), or patriotic odes to factory production and sacrificial domesticity (e.g., The Most Beautiful, 1944)".

Critics like Stephen Prince, Kurosawa translator Audie Bock, and historian David Conrad have argued that what is most striking about The Most Beautiful and Kurosawa's other wartime productions is the extent to which they complicate and even undercut the government's desired message. The Most Beautiful "dutifully praises sacrifice but shrouds it in an air of futility" by focusing on "the individual emotional costs of war."

References

External links 
 
 
 The Most Beautiful  at the Japanese Movie Database

1944 films
Films directed by Akira Kurosawa
1940s Japanese-language films
Japanese black-and-white films
Japanese World War II propaganda films
Toho films
Films with screenplays by Akira Kurosawa
Films set in factories
Japanese drama films
1944 drama films